I'm Still in Love With You is the nineteenth album by Roy Orbison, recorded for Mercury Records and according to the authorised biography of Roy Orbison, it was released in September 1975.

History
After an eight-year stint with MGM Records, he left MGM in 1973, and signed with Mercury a year later. This album had three singles.
This album was only released in the USA.

Track listing
Side One
"Pledging My Love"  –  (Don Robey, Ferdinand "Fats" Washington)
"Spanish Nights"  –  (Roy Orbison, Joe Melson)
"Rainbow Love"  –  (Don Gibson)
"It's Lonely"  –  (Orbison, Joe Melson)
"Heartache (new lyrics)"  –  (Orbison, Bill Dees)

Side Two
"Crying Time"  –  (Buck Owens)
"Still"  –  (Dorian Burton, Howard Plummer)
"Hung Up On You"  –  (Orbison, Joe Melson)
"Circle"  –  (Larry Gatlin)
"Sweet Mama Blue"  –  (Orbison, Joe Melson)
"All I Need Is Time"  –  (George W. Reneau)

Produced by Jerry Kennedy
Executive Producer: Roy Orbison
Arranged by Bill Justis

2002 Re-release
In 2002, the album was re-released in the UK in CD format by Spectrum Music with a different track order.

"Pledging My Love"
"Rainbow Love"
"Heartache"
"Still"
"Circle"
"All I Need Is Time"
"Spanish Nights"
"It's Lonely"
"Crying Time"
"Hung Up On You"
"Sweet Mama Blue"

References

Roy Orbison albums
1976 albums
Albums arranged by Bill Justis
Mercury Records albums